Frederik Mortensen (born 30 October 1998) is a Danish professional footballer who plays as a midfielder for Danish 1st Division club Hobro IK.

Career

Viborg FF
Mortensen joined Viborg FF from Hjørring IF as a U17 player. On 25 April 2017 the club announced, that Mortensen had been promoted permanently into the first team squad.

AC Horsens
On 7 June 2018 AC Horsens announced, that Mortensen had joined the club on a 2-year contract. A month after his arrival, Mortensen was not able to play due to infectious mononucleosis and was out indefinitely.

On 27 June 2019 his contract was terminated by mutual consent after playing only two games for the club.

Skive IK
Skive IK announced on 4 July 2019, that Mortensen had joined the club on a 1-year contract.

Hobro IK
On 16 June 2021, after two season in Skive, Mortensen signed a three-year deal with Hobro IK.

References

External links

Danish men's footballers
Danish Superliga players
Danish 1st Division players
1998 births
Living people
Viborg FF players
AC Horsens players
Skive IK players
Hobro IK players
Association football midfielders
People from Brønderslev Municipality
Vendsyssel FF players
Sportspeople from the North Jutland Region